Bank Misr Building is a skyscraper in Cairo, Egypt. The 29 story building was completed in 1985 and houses the headquarters of Bank Misr.

See also
Skyscraper design and construction
List of tallest buildings in Africa

References

External links

Buildings and structures in Cairo
Residential buildings completed in 1985
20th-century architecture in Egypt